K99 or K-99 may refer to:

K-99 (Kansas highway), a state highway in Kansas
HMS Gardenia (K99), a former UK Royal Navy ship